Gwilym Haydn Jones (born 20 September 1947) is a British Conservative politician who served as Under Secretary of State in the Welsh Office.

Early life 
Gwilym Jones was born in Chiswick, London, on 20 September 1947 and moved to Cardiff in 1960. He worked as an insurance broker. When he was 21 he was elected to Cardiff City Council, and is believed to be its youngest ever member. He became deputy leader and acting leader of the Conservative group on the council.

Parliament 
At the 1983 general election, he was elected as Member of Parliament for Cardiff North. He retained his seat until the 1997 election, when was defeated by Labour's Julie Morgan. Between 1994 and 1997 he served as Under Secretary of State in the Welsh Office.

Personal life 
Jones is active in freemasonry. His daughter, Fay, was elected in 2019 to serve Brecon and Radnorshire after beating Liberal Democrat incumbent Jane Dodds, who had been the leader of the Welsh Liberal Democrats since 2017. Fay became the first Conservative woman to represent her constituency and one of the first three female Welsh Conservatives elected to Parliament.

His wife Linda died on 28 February 2022, aged 75.

References

Offices held

Living people
1947 births
Conservative Party (UK) MPs for Welsh constituencies
UK MPs 1983–1987
UK MPs 1987–1992
UK MPs 1992–1997
Councillors in Cardiff
Welsh Conservative councillors
Freemasons of the United Grand Lodge of England
Members of the Parliament of the United Kingdom for Cardiff constituencies